The 2019 Six Nations Championship (known as the Guinness Six Nations for sponsorship reasons) was the 20th Six Nations Championship, the annual rugby union competition contested by the national teams of England, France, Ireland, Italy, Scotland, and Wales, and the 125th edition of the competition (including all the tournament's previous versions as the Home Nations Championship and Five Nations Championship). 

Wales won the championship for the first time since 2013, beating defending champions Ireland at the Millennium Stadium on the final day to claim their first Grand Slam since 2012.

Participants

Squads

Table

Table ranking rules
 Four points were awarded for a win.
 Two points were awarded for a draw.
 A bonus point was awarded to a team that scored four or more tries in a match or loses a match by seven points or fewer. If a team scored four tries in a match and loses by seven points or fewer, they were awarded both bonus points.
 Three bonus points were awarded to a team that wins all five of their matches (a Grand Slam). This ensured that a Grand Slam winning team would top the table with at least 23 points – a team could lose a match but still win two bonus points and win the other four matches with four try bonus points for a maximum of 22 points.
 Tiebreakers
 If two or more teams were tied on match points, the team with the better points difference (points scored less points conceded) were ranked higher.
 If the above tiebreaker failed to separate tied teams, the team that scored the higher number of total tries in their matches were ranked higher.
 If two or more teams remained tied for first place at the end of the championship after applying the above tiebreakers, the title would be shared between them.

Fixtures
The fixtures were announced on 16 May 2017. The first game of the championship was a Friday night game between France and Wales.

Round 1

Notes:
Paul Willemse, Grégory Alldritt and Romain Ntamack (all France) made their international debuts.
After trailing 16–0 at half time, Wales' win was the biggest comeback in Six Nations history as well as their biggest in any match.	

Notes:
Sam Johnson, Jake Kerr, Gary Graham (all Scotland) and Dave Sisi (Italy) made their international debuts.
Leonardo Ghiraldini earned his 100th cap for Italy.
This was Sergio Parisse's 66th Six Nations appearance, the most by any player in the history of the competition.
Blair Kinghorn's hat-trick was the first by a Scottish player in the Five/Six Nations since Iwan Tukalo managed the feat against Ireland in 1989.
This was Scotland's fourth consecutive Six Nations win over Italy, the first time they have won four in a row against any team in the Six nations.

Notes:
Jonny May's try after less than 90 seconds was England's first at the Aviva Stadium since Steve Thompson scored in 2011.
This was Ireland's first home defeat since they lost to New Zealand during the 2016 end-of-year rugby union internationals, ending a 12-match home winning streak.	
This was Ireland's first home loss in the Six Nations with Joe Schmidt as coach.	
This was England's first win against Ireland at the Aviva Stadium since their 12–6 victory in 2013, which was also Ireland's last Six Nations loss there (a run of 14 games unbeaten).	
England won the Millennium Trophy for the first time since 2016.

Round 2

Notes:
D'Arcy Rae (Scotland) made his international debut.
 This was Scotland's first loss at Murrayfield in the Six Nations since the opening round of the 2016 tournament, bringing an end to a run of seven consecutive home wins in the championship, their longest run of home wins in the Six Nations era.	
 The nine-point margin was Scotland's biggest defeat in any international at Murrayfield since Ireland won 40–10 on the final day of the 2015 Six Nations tournament.
Ireland retained the Centenary Quaich.

Notes:
 Jonathan Davies captained Wales for the first time.
 Alun Wyn Jones made his 50th Six Nations appearance, making him only the fourth Wales player to reach that mark.
 This was Wales' 11th consecutive win in international rugby, equalling their all-time record, set between 1907 and 1910.	

Notes:
 Dan Robson (England), Dorian Aldegheri and Thomas Ramos (both France) made their international debuts.
 Jonny May's hat-trick was the first by an England player against France since Jake Jacob in 1924.	
 This was France's biggest defeat to England since they lost 37–0 in 1911, as well as their biggest loss to any team in the Five/Six Nations since that date.

Round 3

Notes:
Etienne Falgoux (France) made his international debut.
France won the Auld Alliance Trophy for the first time.`

Notes:
This was Wales' 12th consecutive win, their best run, beating the previous record of 11, set between 1907 and 1910.	
This was Wales' first victory against England since winning 28–25 at the 2015 Rugby World Cup, and their first in the Six Nations since a 30–3 win in 2013.

Notes:
Jack Carty (Ireland) made his international debut.

Round 4

Notes
Wales retained the Doddie Weir Cup.	
This 13th consecutive victory continued Wales' best winning run.

Notes:
 This result meant Italy won the Wooden Spoon for the fourth consecutive year, and their 14th since joining the Six Nations.	
	

Notes
Rob Kearney was originally named at fullback for Ireland, but withdrew due to a calf injury and was replaced by Jordan Larmour; Andrew Conway replaced Larmour on the bench.	
Ireland's half-time lead of 19–0 is their largest against France.

Round 5

Notes:
 Marco Zanon (Italy) made his international debut.
 Italy were whitewashed for the fourth consecutive year.
 France retained the Giuseppe Garibaldi Trophy.

Notes:
 Hadleigh Parkes' try was Wales' fastest against Ireland.
 This was Wales' biggest margin of victory over Ireland since 1976.
 Wales won their 12th Grand Slam, their fourth since the expansion of the tournament in 2000 (a record) and also their third under Warren Gatland, a record for a coach.	
 This was the last Six Nations match for Gatland and Joe Schmidt as coaches of Wales and Ireland, respectively, having both announced prior to the tournament their resignations following the 2019 Rugby World Cup.	
		

Notes:
 This was the highest-scoring draw in international rugby history at 76 total points scored.
 This was the first time England had conceded a try bonus point in the Six Nations; they became the final team to do so since bonus points were introduced in 2017. 
 Scotland retained the Calcutta Cup; this was the first time since 1984 they had done so, and the first time since 1989 they had not lost to England at Twickenham (the 1989 match was also a draw).
 The 24-point half-time deficit (and 31-point deficit after 30 minutes) Scotland turned around, was the largest comeback for a draw in international rugby history, beating their own previous record against Wales in 2001.
 With Jonny May's try in the 31st minute, England earned the fastest bonus point try in the Six Nations, beating the previous record they set against Italy the previous week.
 Scotland's six tries were the most they had scored in a match at Twickenham.

Player statistics

Most points

Most tries

References

 
2019
2019 rugby union tournaments for national teams
2018–19 in European rugby union
2018–19 in Irish rugby union
2018–19 in English rugby union
2018–19 in Welsh rugby union
2018–19 in Scottish rugby union
2018–19 in French rugby union
2018–19 in Italian rugby union
February 2019 sports events in Europe
February 2019 sports events in the United Kingdom
March 2019 sports events in Europe
March 2019 sports events in the United Kingdom